is a Japanese voice actress and singer affiliated with I'm Enterprise. As a singer, she is signed to Warner Bros. Home Entertainment. Hayami won the 10th Seiyu Awards for Best Supporting Actress. Her most notable roles include Pramanix in Arknights, Kamisato Ayaka in Genshin Impact, Miyuki Shiba in The Irregular at Magic High School, Yukino Yukinoshita in My Youth Romantic Comedy Is Wrong, As I Expected, Leona in Dragon Quest: The Adventure of Dai, Himawari Uzumaki in Boruto: Naruto Next Generations, Shinobu Kochō in Demon Slayer: Kimetsu no Yaiba, Ryuu Lion in Is It Wrong to Try to Pick Up Girls in a Dungeon?, and Yor Forger in Spy × Family.

Biography
Hayami became interested in voice acting while attending elementary school. In 2004, she attended junior class of Nihon Narration Engi Kenkyūjo, a voice acting training school. Her career began when she passed an audition for I'm Enterprise in 2006, at the end of her second year in training school. Her voice acting debut was in the Indian Summer drama CD. In 2007, she made her anime debut and landed her first major role as Momoka Kawakabe, the main heroine in Touka Gettan. Since then, she has been active in voicing many other characters in anime-related media and other voice acting works. She placed #2 in 2015 Newtype x Machi Asobi Anime Awards for Best Voice Actress while her character Yukino Yukinoshita won Best Female Character Award. She has been hosting her own radio show Hayami Saori no Free Style since 2011 which won Best Comfort Radio in general category at 3rd Aniradi Awards in 2017.

Hayami is known for her singing mainly through her work performing anime and character theme songs, such as Kaede Takagaki in The Idolmaster Cinderella Girls franchise. Her debut single,  was released on August 12, 2015. She wrote the lyrics for all the songs in the single. The title song was used as opening theme for anime television Snow White with the Red Hair in which she voiced Shirayuki. Her second single is a double A-side single "Installation/ was released on February 3, 2015. She also took part in writing and composing both songs. The song "Sono Koe ga Chizu ni Naru" is used as the opening theme for the second season of Snow White with the Red Hair. Her first album Live Love Laugh was released on May 25, 2016. She then released a mini album live for LIVE bundled Limited Edition Live Blu-ray/DVD and CD from her first Japanese concert tour Live Love Laugh on December 21, 2016.

Filmography

Television animation

Original net animation (ONA)

Original video animation (OVA)

Theatrical animation

Drama CDs

Digital comics
 Fly High!, Meru Tachibana
 Demon Love Spell, Miiko
 Super Heroine Gakuen, Haruka Gōriki

Video games
{| class="wikitable"
! Year
! Title
! Role
! Platform
|-
| 2009 || Loveplus || Manaka Takane || Nintendo DS
|-
| rowspan="2" | 2010 || Sora no Otoshimono Forte: Heart-Throbbing Summer Vacation || Ikaros || PlayStation Portable
|-
| Memories Off: Yubikiri no Kioku || Shiina Kodou || Xbox 360
|-
| rowspan="4" | 2011 || Sora no Otoshimono Forte: Dreamy Season || Ikaros || Nintendo DS
|-
| Marvel vs. Capcom 3: Fate of Two Worlds || Lei-Lei/Hsien-Ko || Xbox 360, PlayStation 3
|-
| Tales of Xillia || Leia Rolando || PlayStation 3
|-
| Ultimate Marvel vs. Capcom 3 || Lei-Lei/Hsien-Ko ||Xbox 360, PlayStation 3, PlayStation Vita
|-
| rowspan="6" | 2012 || Rune Factory 4 || Piko || Nintendo 3DS
|-
| Shining Blade || Elmina || PlayStation Portable
|-
| Project X Zone || Lei-Lei/Hsien-Ko || Nintendo 3DS
|-
| Tales of Xillia 2 || Leia Rolando || PlayStation 3
|-
| Under Night In-Birth || Orie || PlayStation 3, Arcade
|-
| E.X. Troopers || Tiki || Nintendo 3DS, PlayStation 3
|-
| rowspan="12" | 2013 || The Idolmaster Cinderella Girls || Kaede Takagaki || Mobile game
|-
| Ange Vierge: The Second Disciplinary Committee Girls Battle || Aurora || Mobile game
|-
| Getsuei Gakuen: Kou || Eiri Mizuki || PlayStation Vita
|-
| Girl Friend Beta || Haruka Kazemachi || Mobile game
|-
| Gunslinger Stratos || Lyudmila N Ignatova || Arcade, PC
|-
| Fate/Extra CCC || Meltryllis || PlayStation Portable
|-
| Shining Ark || Kilmaria || PlayStation Portable
|-
| Super Robot Wars UX || Tsubasa Yuuki || Nintendo 3DS
|-
|Disorder 6 || Shina || PlayStation 3, Xbox 360
|-
| Yahari Game demo Ore no Seishun Love Come wa Machigatteiru. || Yukino Yukinoshita||PlayStation Vita
|-
| Demon Gaze || Fran Pendoll || PlayStation Vita
|-
| The Legend of Heroes: Trails of Cold Steel || Emma Millstein || PlayStation 3, PlayStation 4, PlayStation Vita, PC
|-
| rowspan="8" | 2014 || Dengeki Bunko: Fighting Climax || Miyuki Shiba ||
|-
| Corpse Party: Blood Drive || Kuon Niwa ||
|-
| Gunslinger Stratos 2 || Lyudmila N Ignatova || Arcade, PC
|-
| Mahouka Koukou no Rettousei: LOST ZERO || Miyuki Shiba || Mobile game
|-
| Mahouka Koukou no Rettousei: Out of Order || Miyuki Shiba || PlayStation Vita
|-
| Phantasy Star Nova || Juno || PlayStation Vita
|-
| Shining Resonance || Kirika || PlayStation 3
|-
| The Legend of Heroes: Trails of Cold Steel II || Emma Millstein || PlayStation 3, PlayStation 4, PlayStation Vita, PC
|-
| rowspan="14" | 2015 || Battle Girl High School || Kurumi Tokiwa || Mobile game
|-
| BlazBlue Chrono Phantasma Extend || Mai Natsume || PlayStation 3, PlayStation 4, PlayStation Vita, Xbox One, PC
|-
| Bloodborne: The Old Hunters || Plain Doll, Lady Maria of the Astral Clocktower|| PlayStation 4
|-
| Devil May Cry 4: Special Edition || Kyrie || PlayStation 4, Xbox One, PC
|-
| Fate/Grand Order || Atalanta, Atalanta (Alter), Ushiwakamaru, Ushiwakamaru (Assassin), Martha, Meltryllis, Mysterious Alter Ego Λ, Taira no Kagekiyo||Mobile game
|-
| Tokyo Mirage Sessions ♯FE || Caeda || Wii U
|-
| JoJo's Bizarre Adventure: Eyes of Heaven || Daiya Higashikata || PlayStation 3, PlayStation 4
|-
| Kantai Collection || Graf Zeppelin, Hagikaze ||
|-
| Princess Connect! || Rei Shijo || Mobile game
|-
| Sengoku Taisen 1615 Oosaka Moyu Yo ha Yumeno Gotoku || Irohahime (Tony.ver) || Arcade
|-
| Owari no Seraph: BLOODY BLADES || Shinoa Hīragi || Mobile game
|-
| Owari no Seraph: Unmei no Hajimari || Shinoa Hīragi || PlayStation Vita
|-
| Syanago Collection || Tesla Model S/Tesla Model S P85D, Suzuki Wagon R/Suzuki Wagon R Stingray || Mobile Game
|-
| Utawarerumono: Itsuwari no Kamen || Munechika ||PlayStation 3, PlayStation 4, PlayStation Vita
|-
| rowspan="8" | 2016 || Phoenix Wright: Ace Attorney – Spirit of Justice || Rayfa Padma Khura'in || Nintendo 3DS
|-
| BlazBlue: Central Fiction || Mai Natsume || PlayStation 3, PlayStation 4, PC
|-
| Sengoku Taisen 1477-1615 Hinomoto Ittou he no Gunki- || Irohahime (Tony.ver), Katsurahime, Yamate-dono || Arcade
|-
| Utawarerumono: Futari no Hakuoro || Munechika ||PlayStation 3, PlayStation 4, PlayStation Vita
|-
| Yahari Game demo Ore no Seishun Love Kome wa Machigatteiru. Zoku || Yukino Yukinoshita||PlayStation Vita
|-
| After School Girls Tribe||Sakuya Kanzaki||Mobile game
|-
| Shadowverse || Ancient Elf, Silver Bolt || Mobile game
|-
|Girls' Frontline
|Vector
|Mobile game
|-
| rowspan="14" | 2017 || Valkyria Revolution || Ophelia Augusta Jutland || PlayStation 4, PlayStation Vita
|-
| ShinNaZuki || Linsy || Mobile game
|-
| Onmyōji || Hana || Mobile game
|-
| Fire Emblem Heroes ||  Caeda || iOS, Android
|-
| God Wars: Future Past || Kaguya || PlayStation 4, PlayStation Vita
|-
| Magia Record: Mahou Shoujo Madoka Magica Gaiden || Oriko Mikuni || Mobile game
|-
| Fire Emblem Warriors || Caeda || Nintendo Switch, New Nintendo 3DS
|-
| Infinite Stratos: Archetype Breaker  || Vishnu Isa Galaxy  || Mobile game
|-
| The Alchemist Code || Chloe  || Mobile game
|-
| Mabinogi Heroes || Miri (Japan) || PC
|-
| Xenoblade Chronicles 2 || Fan la Norne, Lora || Nintendo Switch 
|-
| Another Eden || Mariel, Parisa || iOS, Android
|-
| Magia Record || Oriko Mikuni || iOS, Android
|-
| The Legend of Heroes: Trails of Cold Steel III || Emma Millstein || PlayStation 4, PC, Nintendo Switch 
|-
| rowspan="11" | 2018 || BlazBlue: Cross Tag Battle || Ruby Rose, Orie, Mai Natsume || PlayStation 4, Nintendo Switch, PC
|-
| Langrisser Mobile || Luna || Mobile Game
|-
| Xenoblade Chronicles 2: Torna – The Golden Country || Lora, Haze || Nintendo Switch
|-
|  Valkyria Chronicles 4 ||Minerva Victor || PlayStation 4, Xbox One, Nintendo Switch
|-
| Soukou Musume || Karina Mikazuki || Mobile game
|-
| Dragalia Lost || Elisanne || Mobile game
|-
| Fitness Boxing || Rin || Nintendo Switch
|-
| Food Fantasy || Cheese || Mobile game
|-
| The Legend of Heroes: Trails of Cold Steel IV || Emma Millstein || PlayStation 4
|-
| The King of Fighters All Star || Ein || Mobile game
|-
| Princess Connect! Re:Dive || Rei || Mobile Game
|-
| rowspan="10" | 2019 || Sword Art Online: Fatal Bullet || Sachi || PlayStation 4, Xbox One, PC, Nintendo Switch
|-
| Ace Combat 7: Skies Unknown || Ionela || PlayStation 4, Xbox One, PC
|-
| Azur Lane: Crosswave || Shimakaze || PlayStation 4, PC
|-
| Code Vein || Eva Roux || PlayStation 4, Xbox One, PC
|-
| Warriors Orochi 4 Ultimate || Gaia || Nintendo Switch, PlayStation 4, PC
|-
| DanMachi : Memoria Freese || Ryu Lion || Mobile game
|-
| Arknights || Pramanix || Mobile game
|-
| Sakura Wars || Clarissa "Claris" Snowflake || PlayStation 4
|-
| Iron Saga || Guinevere || Mobile Game
|-
| 13 Sentinels: Aegis Rim || Ryoko Shinonome || PlayStation 4
|-
| rowspan="4" | 2020 || Tekken 7 || Kunimitsu || PlayStation 4, PC, Xbox One
|-
| Genshin Impact || Ayaka Kamisato || PlayStation 4, PlayStation 5, PC, Mobile game
|-
| Demon's Souls || Maiden in Black || PlayStation 5
|-
| Fitness Boxing 2: Rhythm and Exercise || Rin || Nintendo Switch
|-
| rowspan="8" | 2021 || Birdie Crush || Martina Glow || Mobile Game
|-
|Demon Slayer: Kimetsu no Yaiba – The Hinokami Chronicles || Shinobu Kocho || PlayStation 4, PlayStation 5, PC, Xbox One, Xbox Series X/S
|-
|Shin Megami Tensei V || Tao Isonokami || Nintendo Switch
|-
|Genshin Impact || Kamisato Ayaka || PlayStation 4, PlayStation 5, PC, Mobile game
|-
|Azur Lane|Shimakaze
|Mobile game
|-
|Counter:Side|Elizabeth Pendragon
|iOS, Android, PC
|-
|Super Robot Wars 30|Mitsuba Greyvalley
|PlayStation 4, Nintendo Switch, PC
|-
|The Idolmaster: Starlit Season || Kaede Takagaki || PlayStation 4, PC
|-
| rowspan="3" | 2022
|Monochrome Mobius: Rights and Wrongs Forgotten || Munechika || PlayStation 5, PlayStation 4, PC
|-
|Valkyrie Elysium || Taika|| PlayStation 5, PlayStation 4, PC
|-
| Mario + Rabbids Sparks of Hope || Edge || Nintendo Switch
|- 
|rowspan="2" | 2023
| Fire Emblem Engage || Chloé || Nintendo Switch
|-
| Blue Archive || Nagisa Kirifuji || Mobile game
|}

Dubbing

Live-action100 Days My Prince (Yeon Hong-shim / Yoon Yi-seo (Nam Ji-hyun))1987: When the Day Comes (Yeon-hee (Kim Tae-ri))Around the World in 80 Days (Abigail Fix Fortescue (Leonie Benesch))Avatar: The Way of Water (Kiri (Sigourney Weaver))The Beguiled (Alicia (Elle Fanning))Black Beauty (Jo Green (Mackenzie Foy))Black Panther: Wakanda Forever (Riri Williams / Ironheart (Dominique Thorne))Carrie (Sue Snell (Gabriella Wilde))The Conjuring (Judy Warren (Sterling Jerins))Death on the Nile (Rosalie Otterbourne (Letitia Wright))Debris (Isla Vandeberg (Alisha Newton))Free Guy (Millie / Molotov Girl (Jodie Comer))Fright Night 2: New Blood (Amy Peterson (Sacha Parkinson))Galveston (Rocky (Elle Fanning))Geek Charming (Dylan Schoenfield (Sarah Hyland))Genius (Marie Winteler (Shannon Tarbet))Gossip Girl (Kate Keller (Tavi Gevinson))Halo (Makee (Charlie Murphy))Heidi (Klara (Isabelle Ottmann))Home Alone: The Holiday Heist (Alexis Baxter (Jodelle Ferland))Hot Summer Nights (McKayla Strawberry (Maika Monroe))House of the Dragon (Princess Ryaenyra Targaryen (Emma D'Arcy))Into the Storm (Kaitlyn (Alycia Debnam-Carey))Jurassic World Dominion (Gemma Zhao (Jasmine Chiu))The Knight of Shadows: Between Yin and Yang (Nie Xiaoqian (Zhong Chuxi))Legend of the Demon CatThe Lovely Bones (Susie Salmon (Saoirse Ronan))Mad Max Beyond Thunderdome (Savannah Nix (Helen Buday))Me and Earl and the Dying Girl (Rachel Kushner (Olivia Cooke))The Nevers (Penance Adair (Ann Skelly))The Nice Guys (Holly March (Angourie Rice))Outlander (Brianna "Bree" Randall (Sophie Skelton))Pacific Rim Uprising (Amara Namani (Cailee Spaeny))Parasite (2021 NTV edition) (Park Da-hye (Jung Ji-so))Parental Guidance (Harper Simmons (Bailee Madison))Pinocchio (Fabiana (Kyanne Lamaya))Rebecca (New Era Movies Edition) (Mrs. de Winter (Joan Fontaine))Roman Holiday (2022 NTV edition) (Princess Ann (Audrey Hepburn))Sisters in Arms (Zara (Dilan Gwyn))Spider-Man: Far From Home (E.D.I.T.H. (Dawn Michelle King))St. Elmo's Fire (2022 The Cinema edition) (Leslie Hunter (Ally Sheedy))Station Eleven (Kirsten Raymonde (Mackenzie Davis))They Found Hell (Trish (Katy Reece))The Untamed (Jiang Yanli (Xuan Lu))Vampire Dog (Skylar (Julia Sarah Stone))Venom: Let There Be Carnage (Frances Barrison / Shriek (Naomie Harris))Winter's Tale (Beverly Penn (Jessica Brown Findlay))

AnimationThe Boss Baby: Family Business (Staci)Comfyland (Feely)Lookism (Park Ha Neul/Mirei Kagawa)RWBY (Ruby Rose)Smallfoot (Meechee)Wish Dragon (Li Na)

Anime-related songs
 Touka Gettan (TV series), theme song performance (OP/ED)
 Wagaya no Oinarisama. (TV series), theme song performance (ED)
 Sekirei (TV series), theme song Performance (OP/ED)
 Sekirei ~Pure Engagement~ (TV series), theme song performance (OP/ED)
 Sora no Otoshimono (TV series), theme song performance (OP/ED)
 Basquash! (TV series), theme song performance (OP - Eclipse)
 Towa no Quon (Movie Series), insert song performance
 MM! (TV series), theme song performance (OP/Shared)
 The World God Only Knows (TV series), theme song performance (ED/Shared)
 The World God Only Knows : Megami-Hen (TV series), theme song performance (OP)
 Yahari Ore no Seishun Love Come wa Machigatteiru (TV series), theme song performance (ED)
 Sword Art Online (TV series), character song performance
 The Idolmaster Cinderella Girls (video game), song performances
 E.X. Troopers (video game), theme song performance (insert song/ED)
 Phantasy Star (video game), theme song performance (ED)
 The Irregular at Magic High School (TV series), character song performances
 Yahari Ore no Seishun Love Come wa Machigatteiru. Zoku (TV series), theme song performance (ED)
 Show by Rock!! (video game, TV series), song performances
 Akagami no Shirayuki-hime (TV series), theme song performance (OP)
 Akagami no Shirayuki-hime 2nd Season (TV series), theme song performance (OP)Fukumenkei Noise, theme song performance (ED/insert/OP)
 Tsukimonogatari (TV series), theme song performance (OP)
 Fuuka (TV series), theme song performance (ED), character songs
 Yahari Ore no Seishun Love Come wa Machigatteiru. Kan (TV series), theme song performance (ED)
 RWBY: Ice Queendom (TV series), theme song performance (ED)
 Is It Wrong to Try to Pick Up Girls in a Dungeon? IV'' (TV series), theme song performance (ED/OP)

Discography

Singles

Albums

Studio albums

Mini albums

References

External links
Official agency profile 

Saori Hayami at Warner Bros. Home Entertainment 

1991 births
Living people
Anime singers
I'm Enterprise voice actors
Japanese YouTubers
Japanese video game actresses
Japanese voice actresses
Japanese women pop singers
Music YouTubers
Seiyu Award winners
Singers from Tokyo
Waseda University alumni
Voice actresses from Tokyo
21st-century Japanese actresses
21st-century Japanese women singers
21st-century Japanese singers